Jacobus Johannes Cabous Eloff (born 30 July 1998) is a South African rugby union player who plays for the  in Super Rugby. His playing position is prop. He has signed for the Rebels squad in 2020.

Super Rugby statistics

References

External links
Rugby.com.au profile
itsrugby.co.uk profile

1998 births
South African rugby union players
Living people
Rugby union props
Melbourne Rebels players
South African expatriate rugby union players
Expatriate rugby union players in Australia
Blue Bulls players